Melina Manandhar (Nepali: मेलिना मानन्धर; born January 23, 1977, as Sunita Manandhar) is a Nepali actress, model and producer. She has acted in films, telefilms, television serials and music videos in Nepali and Newar languages.

Career
Since making her debut in Priyasi (1993) she has acted in over sixty Nepali and Nepal Bhasa language films and television dramas. She also produced a Nepali film Jwalamukhi and a television show Karuna which aired on Nepal Television.

She won the National Film Award in a special category as Best Actress for Indigenous Movie for her performance in Nepal Bhasa  film Balamaiju in 2010.

She joined the Nepali Congress party in 2013.

In 2014 she was appointed as a member of the Censor Board of Nepal by Ministry of Information and Communication.

Personal life 
She was born to Maan Krishna Manandhar and Lalita Manandhar and spent most of her childhood in Kathmandu. She married actor Mukesh Dhakal in 2008 and they have a daughter Melishka Dhakal.
She resides in the United States with her husband and daughter.

Filmography

References

External links

Living people
Nepalese female models
1977 births
Actors from Kathmandu
Nepalese film actresses
Actresses in Nepali cinema
Nepalese film producers
20th-century Nepalese actresses
21st-century Nepalese actresses
Newar-language film actresses
Nepalese women film producers